Pithyotettix is a genus of true bugs belonging to the family Cicadellidae.

The species of this genus are found in Europe.

Species:
 Pithyotettix abietinus Fallén, 1806
 Pithyotettix altaicus Vilbaste, 1965

References

Cicadellidae
Hemiptera genera